The Society for Underwater Historical Research (SUHR) was an amateur maritime archaeology organisation operating in South Australia (SA). It was formed in 1974 by recreational scuba divers and other persons to pursue an interest in maritime archaeology and maritime history. The SUHR was renamed as the South Australian Archaeology Society in March 2012 as part of a plan to expand its activities beyond maritime archaeology to include other archaeological disciplines.
 Santiago – survey of the abandoned hull near Port Adelaide during 1978.
 Lady Kinnaird – the recovery of a large anchor from the wreck site near Port Neill during 1979 in response to a request from the local community, and its subsequent conservation and installation for public display in Port Neill in 1980.
 
 Norma – a survey of the wreck site located west of Semaphore during the period April to December 1979.

The 1980s
 An anchor found in Fishery Bay near Port Lincoln by an abalone diver was recovered by the SUHR and local divers during January 1981. It was then conserved with the intent of placing it on public display at 'Whaler’s Way', a privately owned nature reserve near the site where the anchor was originally found. The anchor is currently on display at the Axel Stenross Maritime Museum in Port Lincoln.
 Tigress – discovery of the shipwreck at Robinson Point south of Port Noarlunga in late 1981 and the subsequent recovery of artefacts from shipwreck site in early 1982.
 Wardang Island – a survey carried out in early 1982 to locate and document the wreck sites of the following ships – SS Australian, MacIntyre, Monarch, Notre Dame D'Arvor, SS Investigator, Songvaar, Moorara, and Maid of Australia. The strandings of the ships Candida, and Jean Bart were also studied.
  – the unsuccessful search for the wreck site near Ardrossan during 1982 and 1983 up until its discovery by others in April 1983. The SUHR subsequently assisted on archaeology surveys during the three seasons of fieldwork conducted by the South Australian Government in the late 1980s.
  – the discovery of the shipwreck in the River Murray near Blanchetown in 1982 followed by a survey project in 1984 in association with the South Australian Government and divers from the South Australian Police.
 Cowrie (also spelt Cowry) – unsuccessful search for the wreck site near Yankalilla during 1987.
 Port Elliot – a survey carried out during 1987 and 1988 to locate and document the wreck sites of the following ships: Emu, Commodore, Josephine L'Oizeau, Lapwing, Harry, Flying Fish and Athol.
 Margaret Brock Reef – a project conducted during 1987 to locate the wreck of the Margaret Brock on the Margaret Brock Reef near Kingston SE.
 The North Arm Ships' Graveyard – a project run during the years 1989 and 1990 to research and survey abandoned hulls in North Arm of the Port River such as the following – Flinders, Gem, Grace Darling, Garthneill, Karatta, Mangana, Sarnia, Dorothy H, Sterling, Stanley, Sunbeam and Ullock.
 "Steamships" was a project to research and survey the following steam-powered vessels during 1989 -1990 – SS Australian, SS Investigator, and SS Willyama.
The SUHR also participated in archaeological work organised by others concerning the following wreck sites:
 Wreck site of an unknown vessel near Point Cloates, Ningaloo, Western Australia during 1980.
 , Port Gregory, Western Australia during 1983.<ref>Marfleet, B.; (1983) 'Xantho, A Visit to WA's first steamer,' in Annual Report 1983, Society for Underwater Historical Research, North Adelaide, SA.</</ref>
 , near Cape York Peninsula, Queensland during 1984.<ref>Drew, T.; (1986) "The 1984 HMS Pandora Expedition," Annual Report 1985-86, Society for Underwater Historical Research, North Adelaide, SA.</</ref>

The 1990s
 Lillie May – an unsuccessful search for the wreck site near Port Hughes during 1992.
 Holdfast Bay – a second project carried out at the remains of the Glenelg Jetty destroyed in 1948 during early 2000 to undertake additional survey and artefact recovery works and to create an exhibit in the former Glenelg Town Hall.

The 2000s
 Star of Greece – a second project involving a non-disturbance measured survey was carried out from 2002 to 2004.
SS Ellen – survey of the wreck site located at Morgan’s Beach near Cape Jervis in early 2003.

Advocacy
During the late 1970s and the early 1980s, the SUHR actively lobbied alone and with others for government action on the following matters:
 Extension of the Commonwealth Historic Shipwrecks Act 1976 to the coastal waters of South Australia (i.e. from the Low Water Mark out to three nautical miles) which was realized in 1980.
 The enactment of specific South Australian shipwrecks legislation to complement the Commonwealth Act which was realised in 1981,
 The appointment of a Government maritime archaeologist which was realised in late 1981
 The creation of a maritime museum which was realised by the opening of the South Australian Maritime Museum at Port Adelaide in 1986.

Publications

Reports

 Sexton, Robert T., (1976), Shape of Ships: The Cross-section OCLC: 221124455.
 Various, (1977), Loch Vennachar Expedition Report,. OCLC: 27625714.
 Hale, Alan, (1980), The Wreck of the Lady Kinnaird, OCLC: 220361798.
 Various, (1983), Wardang Island: Graveyard of Ships: Technical Report, OCLC: 220216731.
 Various, (1983), Wardang Island: Graveyard of Ships, OCLC: 220216792.
 Drew, Terry, (1983), The Holdfast Bay Project 1974–1978, OCLC: 220188245.
 Kentish, Peter & Booth, Brenton, (1983), Conservation of the Loch Vennachar Anchor, OCLC: 215801002.
 Kentish, Peter; Drew, Terry & Booth, Brenton (1985), The Anchor – Fishery Bay, Eyre Peninsular, OCLC: 27625732.
 Harris, Chris A., (1986), The Discovery and Survey of the wreck Tigress, OCLC: 219985703.
 Perkins, John, (1988), The Shipwrecks of Port Elliot 1853–1864, OCLC: 26446519.
 Christopher, Peter, South Australian Shipwrecks: A Database (1802–1989); Paperback edition – (1990), and PDF on CD-ROM (Adobe Version 5) edition (2006),  OCLC: 25914190 and OCLC: 224865467.
 Marfleet, Brian, (2006), The Morgan Project, ( – set containing volumes 1 & 2), The Morgan Project: Volume 1 – Progress, Newsletter & Annual Reports (1977–1983)  and The Morgan Project: Volume 2 – The Final Report (1989)  – PDF on CD-ROM (Adobe Version 5) edition OCLC: 224749850.

Collections
 Cowan, David (editor), (2007), The Society for Underwater Historical Research – Publications 1974–2004,. OCLC: 225516296.

Serials
 Annual Reports for the years 1979 to 1988  OCLC: 220111704.
 Soundings  – newsletter prepared during the years 1988 to 1992  OCLC: 220469036.
 Soundings (2nd Series) – newsletter prepared during the years 2000 to 2004  OCLC: 220469036.

Gallery

See also

References

Further reading
 Christopher, P., (1979), 'Some South Australian Shipwrecks', The Journal of the Historical Society of South Australia, ed. Nance, C., Historical Society of South Australia, North Adelaide, SA, No. 6, pp. 3–11.
 Christopher, P., (2009), Australian shipwrecks : a pictorial history, Axiom, Stepney, South Australia.
 Hartell, R. & Richards, N., 2001, Garden Island Ships, Graveyard Maritime Heritage Trail, (Booklet) Heritage South Australia, Department of Environment and Heritage, Adelaide.
 Jeffery, W.F. (principal author), (1987), The Water Witch Wrecksite, A Report on the Identification, Survey & Partial Recovery of the Wrecksite, Department of Environment & Planning, Adelaide SA.
 Kenderdine, S., (1993), Historic Shipping on the River Murray: A guide to the terrestrial and submerged archaeological sites in South Australia, State Heritage Branch, Department of Environment and Land Management, Adelaide, SA.
 Nash, Michael (editor); (2007), Shipwreck Archaeology in Australia, University of Western Australia Press, Crawley, WA,.

External links
 SUHR Publications website archived 18 October 2020.

Maritime archaeology
Archaeological organizations
Maritime history of Australia
1974 establishments in Australia
Organisations based in South Australia